Radoslav "Rade" Stojanovć (born 20 September 1978) is a retired Macedonian handball player and current coach of Qatar SC.

References
http://www.eurohandball.com/ec/cl/men/2014-15/player/510301/Radoslav+Stojanovic

1978 births
Living people
Macedonian male handball players
Sportspeople from Veles, North Macedonia
Macedonian people of Serbian descent